Cuproxena tarijae is a species of moth of the family Tortricidae. It is found in Bolivia.

The wingspan is 18 mm. The ground colour of the forewings is pale brownish orange with brownish suffusions and strigulation (fine streaks). The hindwings are cream orange, but pale brownish in the anal area.

Etymology
The species name refers to Tarija Department in Bolivia.

References

Moths described in 2013
Cuproxena